Andrew Ritchie may refer to:

 Andrew Ritchie (art historian) (1907–1978), Scottish-born American art historian
 Andrew Ritchie (Brompton) (born 1947), founder of Brompton Bicycle Ltd
 Andy Ritchie (English footballer) (born 1960), former English football player and manager
 Andy Ritchie (Scottish footballer) (born 1956), former Scottish football player
 Andrew Ritchie (British Army officer) (born 1953), director of Goodenough College, former Commandant of the Royal Military Academy Sandhurst
 Andy Ritchie (swimmer) (born 1958), former Canadian swimmer
 Andrew Ritchie, cycling historian associated with Major Taylor
 Andrew Jackson Ritchie (1868–1948), Georgia State representative, in the US
 Andrew Ritchie (priest) (1880–1956), Anglican priest

See also
 Andrew (disambiguation)